Paweł Oleksy (born 1 April 1991) is a Polish professional footballer who plays as a left-back for Stal Rzeszów.

Career

Club
He is a trainee of Skalnik Czarny Bór. In the summer 2010 he was loaned to Chrobry Głogów from Zagłębie Lubin. In January 2011, he was loaned to Górnik Polkowice on a one-year deal.

In July 2011, he was loaned to Zawisza Bydgoszcz.

On 22 September 2020, he returned to Chrobry Głogów 10 years after his first season at the club, on loan for the 2020–21 season.

International
He was a part of Poland national under-19 football team. Since September 2011 he's taken part in European Under-21 Football Championship qualification.

Honours
Stal Rzeszów
II liga: 2021–22

References

External links
 
 

1991 births
People from Kamienna Góra
Sportspeople from Lower Silesian Voivodeship
Living people
Polish footballers
Poland youth international footballers
Poland under-21 international footballers
Association football defenders
Zagłębie Lubin players
Chrobry Głogów players
Górnik Polkowice players
Zawisza Bydgoszcz players
Piast Gliwice players
Ruch Chorzów players
Podbeskidzie Bielsko-Biała players
Bruk-Bet Termalica Nieciecza players
Stal Rzeszów players
Ekstraklasa players
I liga players
II liga players